This articles lists anti corruption advocacy groups and agencies in Ghana.

The Center for Democratic Development (CDD)
IMANI Ghana
Transparency International
Child's Right International
Occupy Ghana
Ghana Anti-Corruption Coalition
Alliance for Social Equity and Public Accountability-ASEPA.    
Anti-Fraud Initiative Ghana
Crusaders Against Corruption Ghana

See also 
 Corruption in Ghana

References

Corruption in Ghana